The Battle of Orthez was fought during the French Wars of Religion, at Orthez on Wednesday August 24, 1569. Huguenot forces under the leadership of Gabriel de Montgomery defeated Royalist forces under General Terride in French Navarre. Following the battle, Huguenot forces killed many of their Catholic prisoners.

Background
In the later half of the sixteenth century, all Aquitaine above the Garonne except for Bordeaux was in Protestant hands.  At that time, Orthez was the largest and most dynamic city of Béarn.  It was a market town which served as the main funnel for products making their way to Bayonne for export.  Orthez was therefore quite wealthy.  One wealthy Protestant, Adrien-Arnaud de Gachassin, had gifted his mansion in Orthez to Jeanne d' Albret in 1555 (today, it is called Maison of Jeanne d' Albret and has become a museum of how wealthy Protestants lived). The Huguenots were therefore desirous of capturing the important and wealthy town of Orthez.

En route to Orthez

The Protestant forces of Montgomery and Montamat had left Castres around noon on July 27, 1569.  They pillaged along the way, passing through Mazères in Foix. The troops crossed the Garonne and the Gave at Coarreze and by August 9, they reached Queen Jeanne d' Albret’s castle at Navarrenx. On August 11, the troops were on the move again and now headed for Orthez.  By August 15, after a relentless siege, Montgomery had weakened Orthez greatly. On August 24, Huguenots captured the town and massacred many of the imprisoned Catholics. Among the victims were Terride, Bassillon, governor of Navarrenx, as well as other leadership and troops in Terride’s defenses, local clergy, and people of Orthez.  A special death was contrived for the clergy - they were thrown to their deaths from the heights of Orthez's Le Pont-Vieux over the Gave de Pau. In addition, the local Moncade castle was destroyed as well as the town’s churches and many homes.

Aftermath

Massacre of religious opponents characterised much of the Wars of Religion. Montgomery’s Huguenot troops committed subsequent massacres of Catholics in Artix, Tarbes, and elsewhere, while a massacre of Protestants took place in Paris and a number of other cities in August-September 1572.

Jeanne III d'Albret (1528–1572), queen of Navarre, and considered “queen of the Huguenots” played a leading role during the French Wars of Religion in the vast territory of Guyenne in southwestern France.  Her goal was to create a Protestant Guyenne by force of arms. Based on correspondence and the memoirs of Jeanne III d'Albret, as well as the fact that the war was taken specifically to Orthez and Navarrenx by her direct orders, the historian Communay posits that she herself may have ordered the slaughter of the Catholic prisoners. Doubtless, however, the Huguenots were so enraged from the persecution inflicted on them by the Catholics that they could not be restrained from the massacre.

The massacre at Orthez occurred three years to the day before the St. Bartholomew's Day massacre in Paris, which some historians suggest may have been a revenge killing for the massacre of Catholics in Orthez. In all, both events fit into the bigger picture of the Wars of Religion.

History of Catholicism in France
Battles of the French Wars of Religion
Battles in Nouvelle-Aquitaine
History of Pyrénées-Atlantiques
1569 in France
Conflicts in 1569